Osvaldo Genazzani was an Italian actor who appeared in more than forty films. He appeared alongside Amedeo Nazzari in the 1948 Spanish comedy Unexpected Conflict.

Selected filmography
 The Last Days of Pompeii (1926)
 Boccaccio (1940)
 Saint John, the Beheaded (1940)
 Love Story (1942)
 Measure for Measure (1943)
 Two Hearts (1943)
 Unexpected Conflict (1948)
 Mare Nostrum (1948)
 The Butterfly That Flew Over the Sea (1948)
 That Luzmela Girl (1949)
 In a Corner of Spain (1949)
 Child of the Night (1950)
 4 Dollars of Revenge (1966)
 Clint the Stranger (1967)
 The Boldest Job in the West (1969)
 Watch Out Gringo! Sabata Will Return (1972) as Mormon leader

References

Bibliography 
 Lancia, Enrico. Amedeo Nazzari. Gremese Editore, 1983.

External links 
 

Year of birth unknown
Year of death unknown
Italian male film actors
20th-century Italian male actors